The compound of four octahedra is a uniform polyhedron compound. It's composed of a symmetric arrangement of 4 octahedra, considered as triangular antiprisms. It can be constructed by superimposing four identical octahedra, and then rotating each by 60 degrees about a separate axis (that passes through the centres of two opposite octahedral faces).

Its dual is the compound of four cubes.

Cartesian coordinates 
Cartesian coordinates for the vertices of this compound are all the permutations of

 (±2, ±1, ±2)

See also
Compound of three octahedra
Compound of five octahedra
Compound of ten octahedra
Compound of twenty octahedra
Compound of four cubes

References 
.

Polyhedral compounds